Pape Daouda M'Bow (born 22 May 1988) is a Senegalese professional footballer who plays as a defender for Régional 1 club Reims Sainte-Anne.

Career
M'Bow was born in Guédiawaye, Senegal. He made his debut for Marseille on 13 January 2008 against Rennes, coming on as a 71st-minute substitute for Mathieu Valbuena. On 31 January, he was loaned out to Cannes for the rest of the season. On 21 September 2009, the defender signed his first professional contract, running until June 2012.

Personal life
M'Bow's brothers Moustapha and Moussa are also professional footballers.

References

1988 births
Living people
Association football defenders
Senegalese footballers
Senegalese expatriate footballers
Olympique de Marseille players
AS Cannes players
AC Ajaccio players
R.A.E.C. Mons players
Amiens SC players
Panthrakikos F.C. players
Atromitos F.C. players
US Créteil-Lusitanos players
R.E. Virton players
Le Puy Foot 43 Auvergne players
EF Reims Sainte-Anne players
Ligue 1 players
Ligue 2 players
Championnat National players
Belgian Pro League players
Super League Greece players
Championnat National 3 players
Régional 1 players
Senegalese expatriate sportspeople in France
Senegalese expatriate sportspeople in Belgium
Expatriate footballers in France
Expatriate footballers in Belgium
Expatriate footballers in Greece